Type 18 may refer to:
Bristol Type 18 Scout E, a British single seat biplane fighter built in 1916
Volkswagen Type 18A, a German automobile specially made for the German police
Bugatti Type 18, also called the Garros, a Bugatti car
Murata Rifle (Murata Typ 18), a weapon of the Imperial Japanese Army